{{safesubst:#invoke:RfD||2=Al-Ġazawāt|month = March
|day =  5
|year = 2023
|time = 12:18
|timestamp = 20230305121806

|content=
REDIRECT Early Muslim conquests

}}